Jhargram Raj College (Girls' Wing) is an undergraduate women's college in Jhargram, West Bengal.  It is affiliated to Vidyasagar University. This college offers bachelor degree programmes in various Arts and Science disciplines.

See also

References

External links
Jhargram Raj College (Girls Wing)
Vidyasagar University
University Grants Commission
National Assessment and Accreditation Council

Colleges affiliated to Vidyasagar University
Women's universities and colleges in West Bengal
Universities and colleges in Jhargram district
Educational institutions in India with year of establishment missing